, almost always abbreviated Kansai Gaidai (関西外大), is located in Hirakata, Osaka,  Japan. It is a private university focusing on foreign language studies. Kansai is the proper name of the large region where it is located, which includes the cities of Kyoto, Osaka and Kobe. Gaidai is a contraction of Gaikokugo Daigaku, which literally means "foreign language university". Gaidai is part of Kansai Science City, which is undergoing construction around the campus.

Kansai Gaidai is known for its large Asian Studies program for international exchange students as well as for its Intensive English Studies program for Japanese students planning to study abroad. There are currently two academic campuses: the Nakamiya Campus (中宮キャンパス) and the Hotani Campus (穂谷キャンパス). The original Katahoko campus (片鉾キャンパス) consisted of four dormitories and a gymnasium. Currently, there are about 15,000 students enrolled including two year and four year students from across all regions of Japan. Students from dozens of countries are also present for the majority of the year.

University Background
Tanimoto English School, the forerunner of Kansai Gaidai University, was established in 1945. The original Katahoko campus was founded in 1966 as a University of Foreign Studies.  Today, the Katahoko campus has been converted into a public park and a municipal library. In 1972, the Asian Studies Program was formally established. The Hotani Campus was established in 1984 and currently houses the Department of International Communication and a Confucius Institute. The Nakamiya campus opened in April 2002, and now operates as the main campus of the university. In 2018, the Gakkentoshi campus moved to nearby Gotenyama, within walking distance of the main Nakamiya campus. Gotenyama Campus - Global Town officially opened on April 1, 2018 and had a dedication ceremony on June 9, 2018. New seminar houses are being planned as well to host both international and Japanese students alike. The university is also known for the collaborative effort in the formulation of the Genki Series, books used by dozens of schools to teach Japanese. Several Kansai Gaidai teachers contributed to its teaching methodology and publication.

Asian Studies Program
The Asian Studies Program is located in the Center for International Education at the Nakamiya Campus. Students from all over the world and with various majors participate in this program which is one of the largest in the area. An integral part of the program is the Speaking Partners Program which pairs incoming foreign exchange students with a local Kansai Gaidai student who helps with the adjustment of living in Japan. KGU itself sends about 1,500 students abroad every year to study abroad all over the globe.

Another part of the exchange program is the home stay program which places a limited number of students with local families to provide an immersive Japanese cultural and societal experience. For those students who were unable to get a spot in the home stay program, the school offers a home visit program which pairs a foreign exchange student with a family so that the student may visit them and participate in families activities usually weekly or as determined by the student and the family.

Accommodation for foreign exchange students are located in the Seminar Houses. Numbered 1 through 4, each house is located around the Katahoko Library and a 20-minute walk from the Nakamiya Campus. Seminar Houses 1, 2 and 4 are dormitory style with usually two students to a room with entire dormitory shared facilities. While Seminar House 3 is an apartment style dormitory with students sharing common living quarters and kitchens while sleeping in 4 separate rooms. Seminar House 4 is the newest and largest of the Seminar Houses and is the only one that is wheelchair accessible at this time. Seminar House 4 houses the most students and is the closest to the Nakamiya campus.

The newest dorm, built in 2018 on the Gotenyama campus, is called GLOBAL COMMONS 結 -YUI-. The dorm has 27 units, in which there are 23 or 27 single rooms. The facility is able to accommodate 650 students. Both international and local students live in this residence. The main concept of the dorm is inter-cultural communication and the diversity of cultures and countries represented.

There is a strict zero tolerance policy against alcohol consumption in Seminar Houses and YUI, although during fall 2008 semester, Seminar House 4 was the location of a pilot project for reasonable and controlled consumption of alcohol within the Seminar House. Results of the pilot project have not been announced nor published although this project did not continue to the spring 2009 semester.  As of 2010, alcohol is banned in all seminar houses after an incident.

International Festival
Every year during the fall semester, Kansai Gaidai University authorizes local and international Gaidai students to organize a grandiose 2-day Gaidai Festival, held throughout the Nakamiya campus. The festival is usually held the week after the Halloween bash and is the largest event of the academic year. Various foods are prepared and student-led university clubs hold exhibitions.

Summer Program
For the first time in 2015, Kansai Gaidai held a six-week intensive summer program for 20 students, focusing on Japanese language and Japanese history with several cultural activities.

The program takes place at Kansai Gaidai’s Nakamiya campus and lasts from June to July. Each week the students receive 15 hours of Japanese lessons and three hours of Japanese history lessons. The current schedule also includes several cultural activities where students can get on-hand experience of what they have learned about in class.

This course is aimed at those who have no previous experience in Japanese. Students can also travel around the country during and after the program.

In 2020, due to COVID-19, the program was suspended altogether. Additionally in 2021, the program switched to an online format.

TEDxGaidai
TedxGaidai was founded in April 2012. It is an international community which comes together in Kansai Gaidai's ICC building once a month to discuss TED videos and how the ideas relate to all of us. Following the discussion time, facilitators will mix students with different members to recap what they have talked about. Finally, the seminar ends with any comments about what was discussed at any time during the evening. A short survey is administered at the end to hear student feedback.

Unions
Some staff at Kansai Gaidai University are represented by the General Union, a member of the National Union of General Workers (NUGW), which is itself a member of the National Trade Union Council (Zenrokyo).

Notable alumni
 Jero (Class of 2002) - Enka and Hip-hop Singer
Masaaki Satake- Seidokaikan Karate and K-1 fighter
Takayuki Yasuda - basketball head coach

References

External links
 University Website
 Asian Studies Website
 Kansai Gaidai Study Abroad Guide Website
 Japanese Alumni Website

Hirakata, Osaka
Educational institutions established in 1945
Private universities and colleges in Japan
Universities and colleges in Osaka Prefecture
1945 establishments in Japan
Kansai Collegiate American Football League